Scopula nucleata is a moth of the family Geometridae. It is found in Ghana, Nigeria, Sierra Leone and on São Tomé.

References

Moths described in 1905
nucleata
Moths of Africa